César Alierta Izuel (born May 5, 1945) is a Spanish businessman, who was the chief executive officer and chairman of Telefónica S.A. from July 26, 2000, until replaced by José María Álvarez-Pallete in 2016. He guided the company through a significant Latin American expansion. Mr. Alierta earned a bachelor's degree in law at the Universidad de Zaragoza (Spain) in 1967. Three years after his degree, he earned  a master's degree in Business Administration at Columbia University in New York, United States.

Career
Mr. Alierta holds a Law degree from the University of Zaragoza and an MBA from Columbia Business School.

1970–85: Banco Urquijo (Financial Analyst)
1985–96: Beta Capital (Founder & President)
1996–99: Tabacalera (CEO)
1999–2000: Altadis (Co-chairman)
2000–Marz 2016: Telefónica (CEO & Chairman)

Main highlights of his presidency at Telefónica

In September 2005, he received the Global Spanish Entrepreneur award in New York, by the Spain-US Chamber of Commerce. This distinction is an acknowledgement for his job as president of Telefónica, leading the firm to entry into the Dow Jones Global Titans 50 index. In fact, Telefónica is the first Spanish company -and one of the very few in Europe to be part of that index, made of the world's 50 most successful, global and largest companies.

In April 2008, he was named president of the Social Council of the Universidad Nacional de Educación a Distancia (UNED), Spanish main open university, with over 100,000 students.

In September 2009 he led one of the main global strategic alliances, putting together Telefónica with Chinese firm China Unicom[1]. Both companies agreed to invest in each other an amount of a billion dollars. The most important part of the cooperation agreement involves research, development and innovation, as well as sharing information on knowledge management and new technologies. This alliance allowed Telefónica to strengthen its position as market leader. It also expanded its client base to over 550 million world-wide, including the clients of its Chinese partner.

In 2009 he was awarded the Tiepolo prize. This award is given by the Madrid-Italy Chamber of Commerce and acknowledges the role of Telefónica as one of the leading Spanish global companies.

Also in 2009, the business association Aragón Exterior (Aragonex) acknowledged him as one of the main Aragonese businessmen with a global reach.

In June 2010, he was awarded the Gold Medal of the Council of the Americas in New York, for his contribution to the growth and development in Latin America. He was the first Spaniard, and the first non-American citizen, to be awarded by the institution. The award is presented to those who work for the progress and advancement of the continent  (source: Europa Press) (source:EFE)
In  June 2010, the President of Telefónica was rated as the best chief executive officer (CEO) of Spain by Thomson Extel Survey 2010.

On September 17, 2010, the City Council awarded a César Alierta Zaragoza with the Gold Medal of the city. The medal will be awarded on October 9 to mark the start of the "Fiestas del Pilar".

On 28 September 2010, he joined the Board of the company resulting from the merger between Iberia and British Airways, International Airlines Consolidate Group (IAG). He became, as well, Chairman of the Remuneration Committee and member of the Nomination Committee.

In June 2012 the German Chamber of Commerce for Spain awarded César Alierta with the Hispanic-German Prize to Business Excellence, for having succeeded in placing the company among the world's telecommunication industry leaders, with a very prominent presence in Germany through O2, a subsidiary of Telefonica.

In September 2012, Alierta was awarded the Heraldo Price 2012.

In November 2012, César Alierta was awarded the Excellence of Business Management by the IX Aragon's Business Forum.

In January 2013, Alierta was included among the twelve most prominent Spaniards in 2012 by the Spanish magazine "Tiempo".

Alierta's vision on Communications
Declarations to the press had been very controversial in Spain, as he suggests charging content providers, application developers and even search engines. Textual declarations include: "we do everything and they (developers, content providers, search engines...) only have the algorithms", "we've opened an opportunity for clever people to generate applications using our communication channels... and we are lucky to own millions of customers that can use them. We will charge for that", "Cloud computing means that the intelligence is in the net. And the net is ours".

Problems with Justice
According to The Wall Street Journal: "A Spanish court found that César Alierta, chairman of Telefónica SA, enriched himself through insider trading before he joined the telecom company, but it acquitted him on the ground that the statute of limitations had run out".

According to Answers.com: "The charges stemmed from 1997, when Alierta and his wife had formed an investment company that they later sold to their nephew. The investment company purchased a large number of Tabacalera shares immediately preceding the purchase of Havatampa and the subsequent rise in tobacco prices, both of which led to an increase in the value of Tabacalera shares. In early 1998 the investment company sold these shares at a great profit".

See also 

 José María Álvarez-Pallete
 Daniel Escoda
 Telefónica

References

External links

Answers.com
"Spanish Minister agrees search companies should pay for network use" eitb.com (15/02/2010).
Telefonica's Website
César Alierta's Official CV on Telefónica Website
César Alierta named the business leader with the third best corporate reputation in prestigious ranking (Spanish)
 Article on César Alierta and his plans for Telefónica
 César Alierta: Telefónica is the ideal ally for the new "digital world"
News story about Telefónica and its president
Resume of Cesar Alierta
Cesar Alierta, one of the most reputated business leaders of Spain
Telefonica goals proposed by Cesar Alierta
César Alierta: previsions about telecommunications industry
"Ideas about the new digital world" by Cesar Alierta
César Alierta receives the 'Gold Medal' of the Americas Society
César Alierta and the merge of Telefónica with Telecom Italy
Telefónica, headed by Cesar Alierta, and UNED create a CSR program
Cesar Alierta, among the five most influential global executives
Cesar Alierta the best CEO in Spain, according to Thomson Extel
Alierta is confident about the Internet giants helping to finance the networks infrastructure

Spanish chief executives
Columbia Business School alumni
1945 births
Spanish businesspeople
Living people
University of Zaragoza alumni
Directors of Telefónica